Treviño is a surname of Spanish origin. It may also appear as Trevino, lacking the virgulilla (tilde). Notable people with the surname include:

Acting
Jesús Salvador Treviño (born 1946), American television director
Mariana Treviño, Mexican actress
Michael Trevino (born 1985), American actor

Crime
José Treviño Morales, Mexican money launderer
Mario Ramírez Treviño (born 1962), Mexican drug lord
Miguel Treviño Morales (born 1970), Mexican drug lord
Omar Treviño Morales (born 1974), Mexican drug lord

Music
Juan Daniel García Treviño (born 2000), Mexican singer, actor and dancer
Rick Trevino (born 1971), American country music artist
Robert Treviño (born 1984), Mexican-American conductor

Politics
Álvaro Pérez Treviño, Mexican politician
Humberto Benítez Treviño (born 1945), Mexican lawyer and politician
Javier Treviño (born 1960), Mexican politician
Jerónimo Treviño (1835–1914), Mexican governor of Nuevo Léon and general
John Treviño Jr. (1938–2017), American politician in Austin, Texas
Jorge Alonso Treviño (born 1935), Mexican politician
José Luis Treviño (born 1955), Mexican politician
Juan Francisco Treviño (fl. 1670s), Spanish governor of Santa Fe de Nuevo México (New Mexico)
Juan Treviño de Guillamas (died before 1636), Spanish governor of Florida and Venezuela
Manuel Pérez Treviño (1890–1945), Mexican politician
Pedro Pablo Treviño Villarreal (born 1972), Mexican lawyer and politician

Sports

Baseball
Alex Treviño (born 1957), Mexican baseball catcher, brother of Bobby
Bobby Treviño (born 1945), Mexican baseball outfielder, brother of Alex
Jose Trevino (baseball) (born 1992), American baseball catcher

Football (soccer)
Carlos Treviño (born 1993), Mexican footballer
José Treviño (footballer) (born 1960), Mexican football player and manager
Patricio Treviño (born 1989), Mexican footballer

Other
Alexander Trevino (born 1981), American mixed martial artist
Helle Trevino (born 1975),  Danish–American bodybuilder
Lee Trevino (born 1939), American professional golfer
Radamés Treviño (1945–1970), Mexican cyclist
Yvonne Treviño (born 1989), Mexican long jumper

Others
Blanca Treviño, Mexican corporate executive and founder of Softtek
Elizabeth Borton de Treviño (1904–2001), American author
Filemón Treviño, Mexican artist
Jacinto B. Treviño (1883–1971), Mexican military officer
Jesse Treviño (born 1946), Mexican-American artist
Joshua Treviño, American conservative political commentator
Marisela Treviño Orta, American playwright and poet
Mily Treviño-Sauceda (born c. 1957), American writer and trade unionist
Philip Trevino (born 1976), American theatrical designer
Roberto Treviño, American chef
Rose Treviño (1951–2010), American librarian in San Antonio, Texas
Steve Treviño (born 1978), American stand-up comedian

See also
Treviño (disambiguation)

Spanish-language surnames